The morning glory Calystegia tuguriorum is a species of bindweed known as New Zealand bindweed, pōuwhiwhi, and  pōwhiwhi. It is a perennial vine which grows in coastal and lowland areas throughout New Zealand, as well as being present in Chile and on the Juan Fernandez islands.

References

Flora of New Zealand
tuguriorum